Shaxian dialect (Central Min: 沙縣事, Mandarin Chinese: 沙縣話) is a dialect of Central Min Chinese spoken in Sha County, Sanming in Western Fujian Province of China.

Phonology
Shaxian dialect has 17 initials, 36 rimes and 6 tones.

Initials

Notes:

Rimes

Some rimes come in pairs in the above table, and they are closely related with the tones: the one to the left only exist in dark level, light level, light rising and departing; while the other only exist in dark rising and entering. It can be compared with close and open rimes of Fuzhou dialect, Eastern Min.

Tones

It's quite different from many other Chinese dialects.

Tone sandhi
Shaxian dialect has extremely extensive tone sandhi rules: in an utterance, only the last syllable pronounced is not affected by the rules.

The two-syllable tonal sandhi rules are shown in the table below (the rows give the first syllable's original citation tone, while the columns give the citation tone of the second syllable):

Some rimes may change their pronunciation because they are closely related with the tones (see above).

References

Central Min